Thieu Hoa is a district (huyện) of Thanh Hóa province in the North Central Coast region of Vietnam.

As of 2003 the district had a population of 190,383. The district covers an area of 175 km². The district capital lies at Vạn Hà.

External links
website : http://thieuhoa.net

References

Districts of Thanh Hóa province